The Town Hall of De Rijp is a former city hall in De Rijp, Netherlands. The government offices have moved, but the former waag and burgerzaal are still used for weddings and other official proceedings. The rest of the building is in use as the local visitor's center of De Rijp.

History
The building was designed by the architect-engineer Jan Leeghwater. He designed and built it 1630, after he had already occupied the location as mayor and manager of the Beemster polder project, completed in 1612. The building survived a fire in 1654 that damaged most of the town south of this building. The former mayor's office and vierschaar can only be seen by appointment, but visitors are welcome on the ground floor, which has a short film about the history of De Rijp for visitors, and where the old weighing scales from 1632 can be seen. One of three old fire hoses designed by Jan van der Heyden in 1672, which were formerly in use by the Town fire brigade can also be seen there. This apparatus has been kept in working order and is used occasionally for demonstrations.

References

 Raadhuis De Rijp

Government buildings completed in 1630
De Rijp
City and town halls in the Netherlands
Museums in North Holland
Rijksmonuments in North Holland
1630 establishments in the Dutch Republic